Cooksey is an unincorporated community in Dent County, in the U.S. state of Missouri.

History
A post office called Cooksey was established in 1905, and remained in operation until 1912. The community has the name of F. E. Cooksey, an early settler.

References

Unincorporated communities in Dent County, Missouri
Unincorporated communities in Missouri